George Russo is a British actor, screenwriter and producer.

Early life and education
Russo was born and raised in London. Russo trained at the Anna Scher Theatre School in Islington. In 2005, he took time away from acting to concentrate on a degree at Central St Martins College of Art and Design.

Career
In 2020, Russo appeared in the BBC soap opera Doctors as Jason Ridlash. In 2021, Russo won the British Urban Film Festival Best Actor Award for Baby Boy, a short film he co-wrote alongside director Greg Hall. A year later, he was cast as Eric Mitchell for an episode of the BBC soap opera EastEnders.

Filmography

Television and film

Music videos

References

External links 
 
 

Living people
20th-century English male actors
21st-century English actors
English film actors
English television actors
Male actors from London
1980 births
Alumni of the Anna Scher Theatre School
Alumni of Central Saint Martins
Date of birth missing (living people)